Reboly is a settlement in the Republic of Karelia of the Russian Federation by the Finnish border, located  southeast of Kuhmo and  northeast of Lieksa. In 1926 the settlement had a population of 1465, in 2010 - 258 people.

Reboly was first mentioned in 1555; by 1679 it was the center of a district with 23 villages and 220 households. Its location on the Russo-Swedish border led to several cases in which the village was destroyed by Swedish detachments. In the nineteenth century it became an often-visited site by Finnish nationalist scholars, such as Elias Lönnrot, Matthias Castrén and D. E. D. Europaeus.

After the Finland's declaration of independence the settlement and its district became an issue in Finnish-Russian relations when its predominantly Karelian population held a vote in August 1918 to join Finland. The Finnish Army moved to occupy Reboly in October. In the Treaty of Tartu, 1920, Finland gave up its claims on Reboly and the neighbouring Porosozero, and instead received Petsamo in the far north, which had  been annexed  by  Finnish  trooрs in 1918.

The anti-Soviet sentiment in Reboly was still strong, and in 1921, after the Red Army re-took Reboly and Porosozero, local pro-Finnish activists formed a short-lived resistance movement known as the Metsäsissit (literally Forest Guerillas). Together with Finnish volunteers, they were instrumental in the East Karelian uprising of 1921-1922.

During the negotiations prior to the Winter War, the Soviet government offered Reboly and Porosozero in exchange for a smaller area on the Karelian Isthmus. The offer was rejected.

Reboly was occupied (1941–1944) by the Finnish 14th Division during the Continuation War, until it was recaptured by Soviet forces.

Climate

References

Rural localities in the Republic of Karelia
Muyezersky District
Povenetsky Uyezd
Geographic history of Finland